Plodio is a comune (municipality) in the Province of Savona in the Italian region Liguria, located about  west of Genoa and about  northwest of Savona. It is in the Val Bormida near the Col di Cadibona.

References

Cities and towns in Liguria